Holy Roar Records was an independent record label run by Alex Fitzpatrick. The label began in January 2006 and put out its first release in June 2006, the Phoenix Bodies album, Raise the Bullshit Flag. Fitzpatrick originally joked that the name was derived from a vision he had whilst on the hallucinogen LSD. According to Fitzpatrick, the name “Holy Roar” was derived from a Torche song with the same title.

History 
Holy Roar Records was formed at the beginning of 2006, when Alex Fitzpatrick moved to London. After previously trialling “thecommunion” with friends in Birmingham during his university days, he and his girlfriend at the time, Ellen Godwin decided to start up a record label. Utilising a loan, they released and promoted Rolo Tomassi (their first “proper” EP), Phoenix Bodies (a grind/punk crossover band) and a split between the bands, Kayo Dot and Bloody Panda. In 2007, Holy Roar Records released records by Gallows, Chronicles of Adam West (tech-metal) and Chariots (screamo). The label was still a hobby at this point, but Fitzpatrick decided to throw in his day job and take the label on as a priority.

Holy Roar Records curated a stage at Offset Festival (2014), hosted a stage at Incubate Festival (2014), partnered with Shock Records, partnered with ArcTanGent Festival (2015)
 and curated a stage at The Great Escape Festival in 2016. 

Holy Roar Records had over 150 releases and nominations by Metal Hammer Golden Gods Awards for “Best Independent Label” and the AIM Independent Music Awards for "Best Small Label" in 2016.

In September 2020, Fitzpatrick was accused by two ex-partners of sexual assault/rape across social media. The allegations were denied, no formal complaints were made and no charges were brought. As a result, several staff members left the label. Consequently bands such as Rolo Tomassi, Apologies, I Have None, Svalbard and Renounced made statements on Twitter that condemned Fitzpatrick's alleged actions.

Other activities

In 2016, Holy Roar Records established a monthly subscription service to allow fans of the label to keep up to date with new releases on a tier basis.

Since April 2015, Holy Roar Records have been producing podcasts hosted by Mario John Gambardella featuring different guests and their perspectives on the UK music scene.

Since 2010, Holy Roar Records has been a member of Pink Mist, a London-based promoter and label collective alongside Big Scary Monsters and Blood & Biscuits. The idea behind this collective was to create an alliance whereby resources were pooled in order to promote their bands to a wider audience. Their first release was a pink and white 12" vinyl limited to 300 copies and released in April 2011 on Record Store Day, "Hello Pink Mist". It consisted of 12 exclusive tracks (4 from each label) in which Holy Roar Records contributed tracks from run, WALK!, Hang the Bastard, Grazes and Bastions. Later that year, Tangled Talk joined the collective to complete the current line-up.

In 2012, they released a download-only free compilation "Hello Pink Mist Volume 2" to coincide with the launch of their new website and in this same year, they were nominated for the Association of Independent Music Awards for "Best Small Label". In 2013, Pink Mist announced a pop-up shop in Boxpark, East London where they sold records and had in-store sessions and in 2014 they collaborated with Relentless (drink) to set up another pop-up shop at No.5 Denmark Street featuring live performances. Pink Mist was also listed in The Guardian's "The 10 British Record Labels Defining the Sound of 2014".

Pink Mist has become a looser entity over time as its initial founders went off in their own directions. However an extension of the brand is still active and currently operates via Pink Mist live gigs which are run by the promoter, Ross Allmark (DICE FM). In honour of Holy Roar Records' tenth birthday, Pink Mist presented the Holy Roar X (HRX) show, hosting bands at The Dome and The Boston Music Rooms in London on Saturday May 21, 2016. The line-up featured Rolo Tomassi, Svalbard (band), Hang The Bastard, OHHMS and more. Pink Mist is now predominately a live event promotion company.

In 2015, Holy Roar Records launched a new sister label, Truthseeker Music, headed up by Holy Roar intern Alex Leat.

Artists 

 A.A. Williams
 Abolition
 Antares
 ANTETHIC
 Apologies, I Have None
 Baptists
 Bastions
 Black Mass
 Bloody Panda
 Body Hound
 Bongripper
 Boss Keloid
 Bossk
 Brontide
 Brutality Will Prevail
 Burning Vow
 Calm the Fire
 Chariots
 Chronicles of Adam West
 Coliseum
 Conan
 Conjurer
 Crocus
 Crossbreaker
 Cthulhu Youth
 Cursed Earth
 Cutting Pink with Knives
 Daggers
 Dananananaykroyd
 Desolated
 Devil Sold His Soul
 Down I Go
 Dream Boats
 Easy Hips
 Eisberg
 Elephant Tree
 Employed to Serve
 Enabler
 End Reign
 The Ergon Carousel
 Eulogy
 Fall of Messiah
 Full of Hell
 Gallops
 Gallows
 Garganjua
 Giants
 Giver
 Goodtime Boys
 The Ghost of a Thousand
 Grazes
 Group of Man
 HAAST
 Hang the Bastard
 Helpless
 Holy Fawn
 Holy State
 Human Future
 IDYLLS
 Ithaca
 Jackals
 Kayo Dot
 Kerouac
 Last Witness
 Le Swing
 Livimørket
 Lonewolves
 Make Do and Mend
 Manuscripts
 Maths
 MINE
 Minors
 Modern Rituals
 Møl
 More Than Life
 Monolith
 Narrow Head
 The_Network
 Never Again
 Nibiru
 OHHMS
 Pariso
 Phoenix Bodies
 Pijn
 Portrayal of Guilt
 Pulled Apart By Horses
 Rend
 Renounced
 Rolo Tomassi
 Rosa Valle
 Rough Hands
 Run, WALK!
 Self Loathing
 Sirs
 Slabdragger
 Slow Crush
 Strife
 Svalbard
 Talons
 This is Hell
 The Tidal Sleep
 Throats
 Throes
 Tortuga
 Touché Amoré
 Trash Talk
 Up River
 We Lost The Sea
 We Never Learned to Live
 We'll Die Smiling
 Will Haven
 Witch Cult
 Wren
 Years Of Abuse
 Young Legionnaire
 Youves

Releases

Albums
{|  class="wikitable mw-collapsible mw-collapsed"
|-
| style="width: 50pt;" | Cat #
| style="width: 250pt;" | Artist(s)
| style="width: 250pt;" | Release
| style="width: 100pt;" | Format(s)
|-
|HRR352 || Fall Of Messiah || Senicarne || CD/Vinyl/Digital
|-
|HRR348 || OHHMS || Close || CD/Vinyl/Digital
|-
|HRR347 || Antethic || 	Mythographer || CD/Vinyl/Digital
|-
|HRR346 || Narrow Head || 12th House Rock || CD/Vinyl/Digital
|-
|HRR342 || Slow Crush || Reel || Vinyl/Digital
|-
|HRR333 || Modern Rituals || This Is The History || CD/Vinyl/Digital
|-
|HRR332 || Elephant Tree || Habits || CD/Vinyl/Digital
|-
|HRR327 || Garganjua || Toward The Sun || CD/Vinyl/Digital
|-
|HRR326 || Giver || Sculpture Of Violence || CD/Vinyl/Digital
|-
|HRR325 || Conjurer & Palm Reader || Conjurer x Palm Reader split || CD/Vinyl/Digital
|-
|HRR321 || A.A.Williams || A.A.Williams (Reissue) || CD/Vinyl/Digital
|-
|HRR315 || Slow Crush || Ease || CD/Vinyl/Digital
|-
|HRR314 || Renounced || Beauty Is A Destructive Angel || CD/Vinyl/Digital
|-
|HRR312 || We Lost The Sea || Triumph & Disaster || Vinyl/Digital
|-
|HRR309 || Minors / Greber || Split || Cassette/Digital
|-
|HRR308 || Pijn & Conjurer || Curse These Metal Hands || CD/Vinyl/Digital
|-
|HRR304 || Modern Rituals || Yearning || Digital
|-
|HRR302 || THROES || In The Hands Of An Angry God || CD/Vinyl/Digital
|-
|HRR300 || We Never Learned To Live || Ode / Live At The BBC  || Vinyl/Digital
|-
|HRR297 || Møl || I/II || CD/Vinyl/Digital
|-
|HRR296 || Holy Fawn || Death Spells || CD/Vinyl/Digital
|-
|HRR291 || We Never Learned To Live || The Sleepwalk Transmissions || CD/Vinyl/Digital
|-
|HRR285 || Minors || Abject Bodies || Vinyl/Digital
|-
|HRR278 || A.A.Williams || A.A.Williams || CD/Vinyl/Digital
|-
|HRR276 || ITHACA || The Language Of Injury || CD/Vinyl/Digital
|-
|HRR270 || Boss Keloid || Herb Your Enthusiasm || CD/Vinyl/Digital
|-
|HRR269 || Burning Vow || Burning Vow || CD/Vinyl/Digital
|-
|HRR266 || Portrayal of Guilt || Let Pain Be Your Guide || CD/Vinyl/Digital
|-
|HRR262 || Pijn || Loss || CD/Vinyl/Digital
|-
|HRR261 || OHHMS || Exist || CD/Vinyl/Digital
|-
|HRR258 || Secret Cutter || Quantum Eraser || CD/Vinyl/Digital
|-
|HRR253 || MØL || JORD (Instrumental) || CD/Vinyl/Digital
|-
|HRR248 || Talons || We All Know || CD/Vinyl/Digital
|-
|HRR246 || Group of Man || What We Got In Common || Digital
|-
|HRR242 || Modern Rituals || The Light That Leaks In || CD/Vinyl/Digital
|-
|HRR239 || Garganjua || Through The Void || CD/Vinyl/Digital
|-
|HRR233 || Conjurer || Retch || Digital
|-
|HRR232 || Svalbard || It's Hard To Have Hope || CD/Vinyl/Digital
|-
|HRR231 || Giver || Heart Of Dark || Digital
|-
|HRR230 || Modern Rituals || Hermit Kuppling || Cassette/Digital
|-
|HRR229 || Minors || Bone Pointer || Digital
|-
|HRR228 || Slow Crush || Aurora || CD/Vinyl/Digital
|-
|HRR227 || Møl || JORD || CD/Vinyl/Digital
|-
|HRR226 || Giver || Dancing With The Devils || Digital
|-
|HRR225 || Rolo Tomassi || Balancing The Dark || Digital
|-
|HRR224 || Conjurer || The Mire || Digital
|-
|HRR223 || Minors || Atrophy || Vinyl/Digital
|-
|HRR222 || Boss Keloid || Melted On The Inch || CD/Vinyl/Digital
|-
|HRR221 || Rolo Tomassi || Time Will Die And Love Will Bury It || CD/Vinyl/Digital
|-
|HRR220 || Watchcries || Wraith || Vinyl/Digital
|-
|HRR219 || Giver || Shock Of The Fall || Digital
|-
|HRR218 || Conjurer || Mire || CD/Vinyl/Digital
|-
|HRR217 || Giants || Four Wheels || Digital
|-
|HRR216 || Rolo Tomassi || Rituals || Digital
|-
|HRR215 || Departures || Teenage Haze || CD/Vinyl/Digital
|-
|HRR214 || Giver || Where The Cycle Breaks || Vinyl/Digital
|-
|HRR213 || Renounced || Theories of Despair || CD/Vinyl/Digital
|-
|HRR212 || Helpless || Sinkhole || Digital
|-
|HRR211 || MINE || Transients || Cassette/Digital
|-
|HRR210 || IDYLLS || Prayer For Terrene || Digital
|-
|HRR209 || IDYLLS || Indian Circle || Digital
|-
|HRR208 || IDYLLS / Palisades || Split || Digital
|-
|HRR207 || IDYLLS || Farewell All Joy || Digital
|-
|HRR206 || IDYLLS || Amps for God/Plague Hell || Digital
|-
|HRR205 || Haast's Eagled || I & II || CD
|-
|HRR204 || IDYLLS || No Virility || Digital
|-
|HRR203 || Pijn || Tanzaro House || Cassette/Digital
|-
|HRR202 || Slabdragger / Wren || Mothers Of Beef And The Magic Of Invention || CD/Vinyl/Digital
|-
|HRR201 || Helpless || Ceremony of Innocence || Digital
|-
|HRR199 || Wren || Scour The Grassland || Digital
|-
|HRR198 || IDYLLS || The Barn || CD/Vinyl/Digital
|-
|HRR197 || Helpless || Debt || CD/Vinyl/Digital
|-
|HRR196 || Employed To Serve || Never Falls Far || Digital
|-
|HRR195 || Wren || The Herd || Digital
|-
|HRR194 || The Tidal Sleep || Bandages || Digital
|-
|HRR193 || The Tidal Sleep || Hearses || Digital
|-
|HRR192 || The Tidal Sleep || Undertows || Digital
|-
|HRR191 || IDYLLS || Maslows Dogs || Digital
|-
|HRR190 || Employed To Serve || Good For Nothing || Digital
|-
|HRR189 || OHHMS || The Magician || Digital
|-
|HRR188 || The Tidal Sleep || Be Water || CD/Vinyl/Digital
|-
|HRR187 || Wren || Auburn Rule || CD/Vinyl/Digital
|-
|HRR186 || Employed To Serve || I Spend My Days (Wishing Them Away) || Digital
|-
|HRR185 || OHHMS || The World || Digital
|-
|HRR184 || Watchcries || S/T || Digital
|-
|HRR181 || Ruetz || Melanoma || Digital
|-
|HRR180 || Brutality Will Prevail || In Dark Places || CD/Vinyl/Cassette/Digital
|-
|HRR179 || Down I Go || Mooncleanser || Digital
|-
|HRR178 || Down I Go || Меня зовут Владимир Путин || Digital
|-
|HRR177 || Down I Go || Witness the Shitness || Digital
|-
|HRR176 || Down I Go || this is Robotcore || Digital
|-
|HRR175 || Down I Go || this is Dinocore || Digital
|-
|HRR174 || OHHMS || The Fool || CD/Vinyl/Digital
|-
|HRR173 || Rolo Tomassi || OST || Cassette
|-
|HRR172 || Group Of Man || World Peace Champions || Cassette/Digital 
|-
|HRR171 || Bossk || I & II Reissue || CD/Vinyl/Digital
|-
|HRR170 || Rolo Tomassi || Boxset || Vinyl
|-
|HRR166 || Pijn || Floodlit || CD/Vinyl/Digital
|-
|HRR165 || Up River || If There Is A God That Is Judging Me Constantly || CD/Vinyl/Digital
|-
|HRR164 || Svalbard || Discography 2012-2014 || CD/Vinyl/Digital
|-
|HRR163 || Apologies, I Have None || Pharmacie || CD/Vinyl/Digital
|-
|HRR162 || Conjurer || I || CD/Vinyl/Digital
|-
|HRR161 || Departures || Death Touches Us, From The Moment We Begin To Love || CD/Vinyl/Cassette/Digital
|-
|HRR160 || Apologies, I Have None/Luca Brasi || Split || Cassette/Digital
|-
|HRR159 || Wren || Host || Vinyl/Digital	
|-
|HRR158 || Giants || Against The Grain (single) || Digital	
|-
|HRR157	|| Fall of Messiah || Empty Colours || CD/Vinyl/Digital	
|-
|HRR156	|| Rolo Tomassi  || The BBC Sessions || CD/Vinyl/Digital
|-
|HRR155	|| Giants  || Break The Cycle (Single) || Digital	
|-
|HRR154	|| Employed to Serve/A Ghost Orchestra  || Split  || Digital	
|-
|HRR153	|| Giants  || Break The Cycle || CD/Vinyl/Digital	
|-
|HRR152	|| Down I Go  || Iceland Extras  || Vinyl/Digital	
|-
|HRR151	|| Helpless  || Helpless  || CD	
|-
|HRR150	|| More Than Life  || Love Let Me Go  || CD/Vinyl/Digital	
|-
|HRR149	|| Eulogy  || Eternal Worth  || Vinyl/Digital	
|-
|HRR148	|| Cursed Earth  || Enslaved By The Insignificant  || Flexidisc	
|-
|HRR147	|| Haast's Eagled  || II For Mankind  || Vinyl	
|-
|HRR146	|| Down I Go  || You're Lucky God, I Cannot Reach You  || Vinyl/Digital	
|-
|HRR145	|| Svalbard  || One Day All This Will End || CD/Vinyl/Digital	
|-
|HRR144	|| Slabdragger  || Rise of the Dawncrusher  || CD/Vinyl/Digital	
|-
|HRR143	|| Pariso  || Pariso  || Vinyl/Digital	
|-
|HRR142	|| Years of Abuse  || Social Order  || Cassette/Digital	
|-
|HRR141	|| We Never Learned to Live  || Crystalline  || Digital	
|-
|HRR140	|| We Never Learned to Live || Shadows in Hibernation || Digital	
|-
|HRR139	|| Rolo Tomassi || Opalescent || Digital	
|-
|HRR138	|| Employed to Serve || Bones to Break || Digital	
|-
|HRR137	|| Employed to Serve || Watching Films to Forget I Exist || Digital	
|-
|HRR136	|| Rolo Tomassi  || Stage Knives (Single)  || Digital	
|-
|HRR135	|| Rolo Tomassi  || Grievances  || CD/Vinyl/Cassette/Digital	
|-
|HRR134	|| We Never Learned to Live || Silently, I Threw Them Skyward  || CD/Vinyl/Digital	
|-
|HRR133	|| Ohmms || Cold || CD/Vinyl/Digital	
|-
|HRR132	|| Employed to Serve  || Greyer Than You Remember  || CD/Vinyl/Cassette/Digital	
|-
|HRR131	|| Svalbard  || Discography 2012–2014  || CD	
|-
|HRR130	|| VA  || Digital Sampler  || Digital	
|-
|HRR129	|| Ohhms  || Bloom  || CD/Vinyl/Digital	
|-
|HRR128	|| Body Hound  || Rhombus Now  || Vinyl/Digital	
|-
|HRR127	|| Rough Hands  || Nothing's Changed  || Vinyl/Digital	
|-
|HRR126	|| Brontide  || Artery  || CD/Vinyl/Digital	
|-
|HRR125	|| We Never Learned to Live/Human Future  || Split  || Vinyl/Digital	
|-
|HRR124	|| Employed to Serve   || Change Nothing, Regret Everything  || Vinyl/Digital	
|-
|HRR123	|| More Than Life  || Do You Remember  || Digital	
|-
|HRR122	|| Up River  || Undertow  || Vinyl/Digital	
|-
|HRR121	|| More Than Life  || What's Left of Me	 || CD/Vinyl/Digital	
|-
|HRR120	|| Enabler  || Flies  || Vinyl/Digital	
|-
|HRR119	|| Bastions  || Bedfellows Part II: The Forgotten Daughter  || Vinyl/Digital	
|-
|HRR118	|| Maths/Throats  || Split  || CD/Vinyl/Digital	
|- 
|HRR117	|| Svalbard  || Gone Tomorrow  || Digital	
|-
|HRR116	|| Svalbard  || Svalbard  || Digital	
|-
|HRR115	|| MINE	|| Disappear || Vinyl/Digital	
|-
|HRR114	|| Rough Hands || Rough Hands || Vinyl/Digital	
|-
|HRR113	|| Monolith || A Votive Offering || Digital	
|-
|HRR112	|| Brutality Will Prevail || Scatter the Ashes || Vinyl	
|-
|HRR111	|| VA || Winter Spring 2013 Sampler || Digital	
|-
|HRR110	|| Conan/Bongripper || Split || Vinyl	
|-
|HRR109	|| Coliseum || Sister Faith || CD/Vinyl/Digital	
|-
|HRR108	|| This Is Hell || The Enforcer || Vinyl/Digital	
|-
|HRR107	|| Last Witness || Saccharine/Less Than Zero || Vinyl/Digital	
|-
|HRR106	|| Bastions || Bedfellows Part 1: The Bastard Son || Vinyl/Digital	
|-
|HRR105	|| Strife || Witness a Rebirth || CD/Vinyl/Digital	
|-
|HRR104	|| MINE || MINE || Vinyl/Digital	
|-
|HRR103	|| Throats || Throats (Repress) || Vinyl/Digital	
|-
|HRR102	|| Full of Hell/Calm the Fire || Split || Vinyl/Digital	
|-
|HRR101	|| Hang the Bastard || 2009-2012 || CD/Vinyl/Digital	
|-
|HRR098	|| Kerouac || Heavy Hearted: Collected Recordings 2009-2011 || Vinyl/Digital	
|-
|HRR097	|| Cutting Pink With Knives || Populuxxe (Reissue) || Vinyl/Digital	
|-
|HRR096	|| run WALK! || Health || Vinyl/Digital	
|-
|HRR095	|| Pariso || 2009-2011 Discography || Digital	
|-
|HRR094	|| Desolated || Verse of Judas || Vinyl	
|-
|HRR093	|| We'll Die Smiling || New Objectivity || Vinyl/Digital	
|-
|HRR092	|| Nibiru || Earthbreeder  || Vinyl/Digital	
|-
|HRR091	|| Monolith || I, Misanthrope  || Vinyl	
|-
|HRR090	|| Last Witness || The Void || Digital	
|-
|HRR089	|| Last Witness || Mourning After  || CD/Vinyl/Digital	
|-
|HRR088	|| Crocus || Our Memories Dress Me in a Dead Lust  || CD/Vinyl/Digital	
|-
|HRR087	|| Jackals/Grazes || Split  || Vinyl/Digital	
|-
|HRR086	|| Goodtime Boys  || Are We Now or Have We Ever Been  || CD/Digital	
|-
|HRR085	|| Brontide  || Coloured Tongues/MFBT  || Vinyl/Digital	
|-
|HRR084	|| Will Haven  || Voir Dire  || Vinyl/Digital	
|-
|HRR083	|| run WALK!/ Sirs  || Split  || Vinyl/Digital	
|-
|HRR082	|| Crossbreaker || Lows  || Vinyl/Digital	
|-
|HRR081	|| VA || Holy Hell Summer Sampler 2011  || Digital	
|-
|HRR080	|| Make Do and Mend || Make Do and Mend  || Vinyl	
|-
|HRR079	|| Abolition || Abolition  || Vinyl	
|-
|HRR078	|| Daggers || Euphoria  || Vinyl/Digital	
|-
|HRR077	|| Rosa Valle || Holy Bermuda  || CD/Vinyl/Digital	
|-
|HRR076	|| Brutality Will Prevail || Sleep Paralysis  || CD	
|-
|HRR075	|| End Reign || End Reign  || Vinyl/Digital	
|-
|HRR074	|| Witch Cult || Witch Cult  || Vinyl/Digital	
|-
|HRR073	|| Jackals/Self Loathing || Split  || Vinyl/Digital	
|-
|HRR072	|| Brontide || Sans Souci  || CD/Vinyl/Digital	
|-
|HRR071	|| Eisberg || Eisberg  || Vinyl/Digital	
|-
|HRR070	|| Gallops || Joust/Eukodol || Vinyl/Digital	
|-
|HRR069	|| Rolo Tomassi || Eternal Youth || Vinyl/Digital	
|-
|HRR068	|| Rolo Tomassi/Antares || Split || Vinyl	
|-
|HRR067	|| Kerouac/Pariso || Split || CD/Vinyl/Digital	
|-
|HRR066	|| The Ergon Carousel || Dead Banks || Vinyl/Digital	
|-
|HRR065	|| Slabdragger  || Regress || Vinyl/Digital	
|-
|HRR064	|| Grazes || Myths || Vinyl/Digital	
|-
|HRR063	|| Cthulhu Youth || Inflatable World... || Cassette	
|-
|HRR062	|| Cthulhu Youth || Cthulhu Youth || Cassette	
|-
|HRR061	|| VA || Happy Holy Roar Mega Box || Cassette	
|-
|HRR060	|| Kerouac ||  Cold and Distant, Not Loving || Vinyl	
|-
|HRR059	|| Baptists || Black Dawn || CD	
|-
|HRR058	|| Maths || Ascent || Vinyl/Digital	
|-
|HRR057	|| Touche Amore || ...To The Beat of a Dead Horse || Vinyl	
|-
|HRR056	|| run, WALK! || Instrumental EP || CD/Digital	
|-
|HRR055	|| Throats/The Ergon Carousel || Kyuss Covers Split || Vinyl/Digital	
|-
|HRR054	|| Hang the Bastard || Hellfire Reign || CD/Vinyl/Digital	
|-
|HRR053	|| Black Mass || S/T || CD/Digital	
|-
|HRR052	|| Bastions || Island Living || Vinyl	
|-
|HRR051	|| Never Again || Year One || Vinyl/Digital	
|-
|HRR050	|| VA || Happy Holy Roar Vol.4 || Cassette	
|-
|HRR049	|| Brutality Will Prevail || Root of All Evil || CD/Vinyl/Digital	
|-
|HRR048	|| Young Legionairre || Colossus/Iron Dream || Vinyl	
|-
|HRR047	|| Lone Wolves || A True Discourse || CD	
|-
|HRR046	|| Rolo Tomassi || Cosmology || Vinyl	
|-
|HRR045	|| Gallops || Gallops || CD/Digital	
|-
|HRR044	|| Jackals || S/T || Vinyl	
|-
|HRR043	|| Last Witness || Give Up || Vinyl/Digital	
|-
|HRR042	|| We'll Die Smiling || Avant-Garde || CD/Digital	
|-
|HRR041	|| run, WALK! || IHTAWSICSSOEAOMITS || CD	
|-
|HRR040	|| Never Again || Live at The Albert, Brighton || Cassette	
|-
|HRR039	|| Antares || L'Espirit de l'escalier || CD/Digital	
|-
|HRR038	|| Throats || S/T || CD/Vinyl	
|-
|HRR037	|| PABH/Holy State || Split || Vinyl	
|-
|HRR036	|| Manuscripts/Betty Pariso || Split || Vinyl/Digital	
|-
|HRR035	|| Trash Talk || East of Eden/Son of a Bitch || Vinyl	
|- 
|HRR034	|| Easy Hips/Dreamboats/Le Swing/Run, Walk! || New Roars on the Block || Vinyl	
|-
|HRR033	|| Holy State/Brontide/The Tupolev Ghost/Shapes || Holy Monsters   || Vinyl	
|-
|HRR032	|| Rolo Tomassi/Throats || Split || Vinyl	
|-
|HRR031	|| Livimorket  || Dark Totality  || CD/Digital	
|-
|HRR030	|| VA  || Happy Holy Roar Vol.3 || Cassette	
|-
|HRR029	|| Holy State || Live || CD	
|-
|HRR028	|| VA || Spring '09 Digital Sampler || Digital	
|-
|HRR027	|| The Ghost of a Thousand || This is Where the Fight Begins || CD/Vinyl	
|-
|HRR026	|| Maths || Descent || CD/Vinyl	
|-
|HRR025	|| Rolo Tomassi || Untitled (Reissue) || CD	
|-
|HRR024	|| Brontide || Brontide EP || Digital	
|-
|HRR023	|| Cutting Pink with Knives || Discography || Digital	
|-
|HRR022	|| Maths || Live Acoustic Medley || Digital	
|-
|HRR021	|| Holy State || Holy State EP || Vinyl	
|-
|HRR020	|| VA || Happy Holy Roar Vol. 2 || Cassette	
|-
|HRR019	|| The Ergon Carousel || The Ergon Carousel || CD	
|-
|HRR018	|| Devil Sold His Soul/Tortuga || Split || Vinyl	
|-
|HRR017	|| Youves || Cardio-Vascular || CD/Digital	
|-
|HRR016	|| Throats/The_Network || Split || CD	
|-
|HRR015	|| Dananananakroyd || Sissy Hits || CD/Digital	
|-
|HRR014	|| Mirror! Mirror! || Silicon Eyes/Wolfgang Bang || Vinyl	
|-
|HRR013	|| Rolo Tomassi || Digital History/Beatrotter || Vinyl	
|-
|HRR012	|| Maths/Throats  || Split || CD	
|-
|HRR011	|| Cutting Pink with Knives || Laser Hannon  || Digital	
|-
|HRR010	|| VA || Happy Holy Roar || Cassette	
|-
|HRR009	|| Cutting Pink with Knives || St Mark/Airz || 	Digital	
|-
|HRR008	|| Rolo Tomassi || Untitled (Reissue) || CD	
|-
|HRR007	|| Cutting Pink with Knives || Populuxxe || CD	
|-
|HRR006	|| Gallows || Demo || Vinyl	
|-
|HRR005	|| Chariots || The Inner Life || CD/Digital	
|-
|HRR004	|| Chronicles of Adam West || We Walk Unbalanced || CD/Digital	
|-
|HRR003	|| Rolo Tomassi || Untitled || CD	
|-
|HRR002	|| Bloody Panda/Kayo Dot || Split || Vinyl/Digital	
|-
|HRR001	|| Phoenix Bodies || Raise The Bullshit Flag || CD/Digital	
|}

Compilations 

For Christmas 2007 Holy Roar Records released a limited edition cassette tape compilation, "Happy Holy Roar!" featuring 20 previously unreleased/ self-released only songs by a variety of bands including some Holy Roar artists.

Since then, Holy Roar Records have released the following via cassette:
 
Happy Holy Roar Vol.2
 
Happy Holy Roar Vol.3 
 
Happy Holy Roar Vol.4 
 
Happy Holy Roar Mega Box 

and the following via digital release only:

Spring '09 Sampler
 
Holy Hell Summer Sampler 2011
 
Winter Spring 2013 Sampler
  
Holy Roar Bitter Autumn 2014 Sampler 

HRX: Holy Roar Sampler 2016

In 2016, Holy Roar Records contributed an exclusive song to the Alcopop! Records Record Store Day release "Sensible Record Labels" Volume 2 compilation.

References 
Footnotes

General references
Interviews with Alex Fitzpatrick of Holy Roar Records

 Rockmidgets.com (31/07/08)
 Mint Magazine (22/05/10)
 Already Heard (21/04/12)

 SWNK (21/05/12)
 Deadpress (17/01/13)
 Louder Than War (18/06/13)
 Endless Wave Dynamics (25/04/15)
 New Noise Rock Show (02/10/15)

British independent record labels